Pentatominae is a subfamily of Pentatomidae, a family of shield bugs. This subfamily is the largest one within the Pentatomidae, having 4937 species classified in 938 genera. Species in this subfamily are phytophages and several of them are considered agricultural pests. Some invasive pentatomines such as Halyomorpha halys and Bagrada hilaris have been considered household pests. Higher systematics of the group have been revised by Rider et al.

Tribes and selected genera
Tribes within this subfamily include:

 Aelini Douglas & Scott, 1865 
 Aelia Fabricius, 1803
 Neottiglossa Kirby, 1837
 Aeptini Stål, 1871 
 Aeschrocorini Distant, 1902 
 Agaeini Cachan, 1952 
 Agonoscelidini Atkinson, 1888 
 Amyntorini Distant, 1902 
 Antestiini Distant, 1902 
 Aulacetrini Mulsant & Rey, 1866 
 Axiagastini Atkinson, 1888 
 Bathycoeliini Atkinson, 1888 
 Cappaeini Atkinson, 1888
 Halyomorpha Mayr, 1864
 Tolumnia Stål, 1867
 Adelolcus - Benia (insect) - Boerias - Cappaea - Caura - Cauromorpha - Erlangerella - Halycorypha - Halydicoris - Halyoides - Homalogonia - Hymenomaga - Lerida (insect) - Leridella - Lokaia - Massocephalus - Paralerida - Prytanicoris - Tenerva - Tripanda - Tropicorypha - Veterna
 Carpocorini Mulsant & Rey, 1866 
 Antheminia Mulsant & Rey, 1866
 Carpocoris Kolenati, 1846
 Chlorochroa Stål, 1872
 Dolycoris Mulsant & Rey, 1866
 Graphorn 
 Peribalus Mulsant & Rey, 1866
 Rubiconia Dohrn, 1860
 Thestral 
 Catacanthini Atkinson, 1888
 Catacanthus Spinola, 1837
 Caystrini Ahmad & Afzal, 1979 
 Chlorocorini 
 Coquereliini Cachan, 1952 
 Degonetini Azim & Shafee, 1984 
 Diemeniini Kirkaldy, 1909 
 Diplostirini Distant, 1902 
 Diploxyini Atkinson, 1888 
 Eurysaspidini Atkinson, 1888 
 Eysarcorini Mulsant & Rey, 1866 
 Carbula Stål, 1864
 Eysarcoris Hahn, 1834
 Halyini Amyot & Serville, 1843 
 Hoplistoderini Atkinson, 1888 
 Lestonocorini hmad & Mohammad, 1980 
 Mecideini Distant, 1902 
 Memmiini Cachan, 1952 
 Menidini Atkinson, 1888 
 Myrocheini Stål, 1871 
 Nealeriini Cachan, 1952 
 Nezarini Atkinson, 1888 
 Palomena Mulsant & Rey, 1866
 Opsitomini Cachan, 1952 
 Pentamyrmexini
 Pentamyrmex spinosus
 Pentatomini Leach, 1815
 Pentatoma Olivier, 1789
 Phricodini Cachan, 1952 
 Piezodorini Atkinson, 1888 
 Rhynchocorini Stål, 1871 
 Rolstoniellini Rider, 1997 
 Sciocorini Amyot & Serville, 1843 
 Sciocoris Fallén, 1829
 Strachiini Mulsant & Rey, 1866
 Stenozygum coloratum (Klug, 1845)
 Eurydema Laporte, 1833

Genera not classified within a tribe include:Leliahttps://mapress.com/zootaxa/2010/f/z02512p062f.pdf

Notable species include:Acrostemum hilare – green stink bugBagrada hilaris – bagrada bugHalyomorpha halys – brown marmorated stink bugPentatoma rufipes – forest bugPiezodorus lituratus'' – gorse shield bug

References 

 

Hemiptera subfamilies